The Johnson County Community College Cavaliers are the sports teams of Johnson County Community College located in Overland Park, Kansas, United States. They participate in the NJCAA and in the Kansas Jayhawk Community College Conference.

Sports

Men's sports
Baseball
Basketball
Soccer

Women's sports
Basketball
Soccer
Softball
Volleyball

National championships
The Johnson County Cavaliers have won 10 national titles since 1993.

Overview
 12 national championships
 21 runner-up national finishes
 99 top 5 national finishes
 142 region titles
 183 conference titles
 More than 1,000 NJCAA All-America Athletes
 74 individual national champions
 More than 500 NJCAA All-Academic Athletes

Facilities
Johnson County Community College has four athletics facilities.
 Baseball stadium
 Gym building (basketball)
 Soccer field
 Softball stadium

Notable alumni

 Tony Harris, former NBA (basketball) player, Boston Celtics
 Kit Pellow, MLB (baseball) player, Colorado Rockies

References

External links
 

Sports teams in Kansas